Suffield-cum-Everley is a civil parish in the Scarborough 
district of North Yorkshire, England.

According to the 2011 UK census,  the parish (including Silpho) had a population of 241, an increase on the 2001 UK census figure of 61.

The parish council is Hackness & Harwood Dale Group Parish Council which covers the six parishes of Broxa-cum-Troutsdale, Darncombe-cum-Langdale End, Hackness, Harwood Dale, Silpho and Suffield-cum-Everley.

References

External links

Hackness & Harwood Dale Group Parish Council website

Civil parishes in North Yorkshire